The following lists events that happened during 1951 in Australia.

Incumbents

Monarch – George VI
Governor-General – (Sir) William McKell
Prime Minister – Robert Menzies
Chief Justice – Sir John Latham

State Premiers
Premier of New South Wales – James McGirr
Premier of Queensland – Ned Hanlon
Premier of South Australia – Thomas Playford IV
Premier of Tasmania – Robert Cosgrove
Premier of Victoria – John McDonald
Premier of Western Australia – Ross McLarty

State Governors
Governor of New South Wales – Sir John Northcott
Governor of Queensland – Sir John Lavarack
Governor of South Australia – Sir Charles Norrie
Governor of Tasmania – Sir Hugh Binney (until 8 May), then Sir Ronald Cross, 1st Baronet (from 22 August)
Governor of Victoria – Sir Dallas Brooks
Governor of Western Australia – Sir James Mitchell (until 1 July), then Sir Charles Gairdner (from 6 November)

Events

1 January – The 50th anniversary of Australian federation is celebrated.
19 February – Jean Lee becomes the last woman to be hanged in Australia, when she, Robert Clayton and Norman Andrews are executed in Melbourne for the murder of a 73-year-old man.
1 March – The Bank of Australasia merges with the Union Bank of Australia to form the ANZ Bank.
9 March – The High Court of Australia rules in the case Australian Communist Party v Commonwealth that the Communist Party Dissolution Bill 1950, passed by the parliament to ban the Communist Party of Australia, was unconstitutional.
19 March – The Governor-General, William McKell, issues a double dissolution of parliament for the second time in its history, citing the Senate's referral of the Commonwealth Bank Bill as a "failure to pass" the bill.
12 April – Conscription begins as the first call-up notice is issued under the National Service Act (1951), requiring Australian 18-year-old males to undergo compulsory military training.
28 April – A federal election is held. The Liberal government of Robert Menzies retains power.
8 June – The first lessons of the School of the Air are broadcast from the Royal Flying Doctor Service in Adelaide.
16 August – The Australian Financial Review is first published.
1 September – The Anzus Treaty, between Australia, New Zealand and the United States, is signed.
9 September – Australia signs the Treaty of San Francisco, formalising peace with Japan.
22 September – A federal referendum is held, proposing to alter the Australian Constitution to allow the banning of the Communist Party. The referendum was not carried.
4 October – Francis McEncroe sells the first Chiko Rolls at the Wagga Wagga agricultural show.
15 October – A De Havilland Dove aircraft crashes near Kalgoorlie killing all 7 on board.
13 November – William McKell is gazetted a Knight Grand Cross of the Order of St Michael and St George, becoming the only Governor-General of Australia to be knighted during their term.

Arts and literature

 Ivor Hele wins the Archibald Prize with his portrait of Laurie Thomas
 Justin O'Brien wins the inaugural Blake Prize for Religious Art with his work The Virgin Enthroned

Sport
 Athletics
 5 March – Gordon Stanley wins the men's national marathon title, clocking 2:59:44.6 in Hobart.
 Cricket
 Victoria wins the Sheffield Shield
 Australia defeats England 4–1 in The Ashes
 Football
 The 1951 French rugby league tour of Australia and New Zealand is conducted
 Bledisloe Cup: won by the All Blacks
 Brisbane Rugby League premiership: Souths defeated Easts 20-10
 New South Wales Rugby League premiership: South Sydney defeated Manly-Warringah 42-14
 South Australian National Football League premiership: won by Port Adelaide
 Victorian Football League premiership: Geelong defeated Essendon 81-70
 Golf
 Australian Open: won by Peter Thomson
 Australian PGA Championship: won by Norman Von Nida
 Horse Racing
 Basha Felika wins the Caulfield Cup
 Bronton wins the Cox Plate
 Delta wins the Melbourne Cup
 Motor Racing
 The Australian Grand Prix was held at Narrogin and won by Warwick Pratley driving a George Reed Special
 Tennis
 Australian Open men's singles: Dick Savitt defeats Ken McGregor 6-3 2–6 6-3 6-1
 Australian Open women's singles: Nancye Wynne Bolton defeats Thelma Coyne Long 6-1 7-5
 Davis Cup: Australia defeats the United States 3–2 in the 1951 Davis Cup final
 US Open: Frank Sedgman wins the Men's Singles
 Wimbledon: Ken McGregor and Frank Sedgman win the Men's Doubles
 Yachting
 Margaret Rintoul takes line honours and Struen Marie wins on handicap in the Sydney to Hobart Yacht Race

Births
 19 January – Charles Blunt, politician
 20 January – Clyde Sefton, road cyclist
 26 February – Wayne Goss, Premier of Queensland (died 2014)
 29 April – Jon Stanhope, Chief Minister of the ACT
 29 May – Don Baird, pole vaulter
 4 July – John Alexander, tennis player and politician
 6 July – Geoffrey Rush, actor
 31 July – Evonne Goolagong Cawley, tennis player
 5 August – John Jarratt, actor
 6 August – Daryl Somers, television personality
 30 August – 
 Danny Clark, track cyclist and road bicycle racer
 Brad Hazzard, politician
 9 September – Alexander Downer, politician
 27 September – Geoff Gallop, Premier of Western Australia
 9 October – Rod Galt, Australian rules footballer (died 2019)
 14 November – Shelley Hancock, politician
 1 December – Doug Mulray, radio personality
 18 December – Andy Thomas, astronaut
 22 December – Jan Stephenson, professional golfer

Deaths

 29 January – Frank Tarrant, cricketer (b. 1880)
 18 April – Daisy Bates, journalist and anthropologist (born in Ireland) (b. 1859)
 27 May – Sir Thomas Blamey, field marshal (b. 1884)
 11 June – William Higgs, Queensland politician (b. 1862)
 13 June – Ben Chifley, 16th Prime Minister of Australia (b. 1885)
 17 June - Vin Coutie, footballer (b. 1881)
 3 July – Sydney Jephcott, poet (b. 1864)
 4 October – Bartlett Adamson, journalist, poet, author and political activist (b. 1884)
 10 December – Ernest Edwin Mitchell, composer (b. 1865)

See also
 List of Australian films of the 1950s

References

 
Australia
Years of the 20th century in Australia